Gradište Monastery is in Buljarica, Montenegro, not far from Petrovac na moru. Like Reževići Monastery,Gradište was originally a medieval inn of the old Serbian Empire. It also was affiliated with Kosovo's Visoki Dečani Monastery. Founded in 1116, Gradište was mentioned in a document from the time of King Milutin in 1307. The monastery's three churches are St. Nicholas', built in 1610; the Assumption of the Holy Mother of God, whose frescoes date from 1620s; and Saint Sava's, both the former built in 1855 and the latter built in the early 1500s.

References 

Budva Municipality
Serbian Orthodox monasteries in Montenegro
1116 establishments in Europe
Christian monasteries established in the 12th century
17th-century Serbian Orthodox church buildings
1610
Churches completed in 1610
Tourist attractions in Montenegro